Never Stop may refer to:
"Never Stop" (Echo & the Bunnymen song), a 1983 song
Never Stop EP or The Sound of Echo, an EP by Echo & the Bunnymen
"Never Stop" (Brand New Heavies song), a 1991 song
"Never Stop" (Bro'Sis song), a 2003 song
Never Stop (Planetshakers album), 2006
Never Stop (The Bad Plus album), 2010
"Never Stop", a 2007 song by Hilary Duff from Dignity
"Never Stop!", a 1997 song by Every Little Thing from the single "Shapes of Love/Never Stop!"
"Never Stop" (Chilly Gonzales song), a 2010 song by Chilly Gonzales
 Never Stop (film), a 2021 film